Thiruvali  is a village in Malappuram district in the state of Kerala, India.

Location
Thiruvali is located between Edavanna and Wandoor in Malappuram District, and Near Pathiriyal, Kerala.

Demographics
At the 2001 India census, Thiruvali had a population of 24,275 with 11,600 males and 12,675 females.

References

More Information please go through following link 

   Villages in Malappuram district
Nilambur area